José Ignacio Seara Sierra (born 6 August 1959) is a Mexican politician from the National Action Party. From 2009 to 2012 he served as Deputy of the LXI Legislature of the Mexican Congress representing Campeche.

References

1959 births
Living people
Politicians from Campeche
Members of the Chamber of Deputies (Mexico) for Campeche
National Action Party (Mexico) politicians
21st-century Mexican politicians
Mérida Institute of Technology alumni
Members of the Congress of Campeche
20th-century Mexican politicians
Deputies of the LXI Legislature of Mexico